Robert "Bobby", "Bob" Goldman (November 10, 1938 – May 16, 1999) was an American bridge player, teacher and writer. He won three Bermuda Bowls (1970, 1971, 1979), Olympiad Mixed Teams 1972, and 20 North American Bridge Championships. He authored books on bridge, most notably Aces Scientific and Winners and Losers at the Bridge Table, and conventions including Kickback, Exclusion Blackwood and Super Gerber (Redwood). He was from Highland Village, Texas.

Goldman first played duplicate bridge in 1957 while studying at Drexel University in Philadelphia. He began teaching six months later and taught "a modest number of classes" until he joined the Dallas Aces team in 1968. His early partners with the Aces were Michael Lawrence and Billy Eisenberg; the team won Bermuda Bowls in 1970 and 1971. About that time he began "teaching heavily—15 department classes a week" and some private lessons. His favorite partner was Paul Soloway, with whom he played more than two decades. Goldman was an American Contract Bridge League (ACBL) Grand Life Master with more than 25,000 masterpoints and a World Bridge Federation (WBF) World Grand Master. He was active in ACBL administration, participating in its Competition
and Conventions Committee, Committee for an Open and Improved ACBL, and Women's Forum. On the former committee he contributed to shaping the ACBL alert procedure, convention card, ethics and appeals process, and smoking ban.

Goldman died of a heart attack in Dallas, Texas, at the age of 60.

Works

Books
 Aces Scientific (Inglewood, CA: Max Hardy, 1978) 
 Winners and Losers at the Bridge Table, illustrated by Mary Grace (Hardy, 1979)

Pamphlets
 Doubles (Louisville, KY: Devyn Press, 1981), Championship Bridge no. 23
 Slam Bidding is Fun (Goldman, 198?) – "The 500 hands were randomly dealt by computer."; created and programmed by Bobby Goldman

Bridge accomplishments

Honors
 ACBL Hall of Fame, 1999
 ACBL Honorary Member of the Year 1999

Wins
 Bermuda Bowl (3) 1970, 1971, 1979
 Olympiad Mixed Teams (1) 1972
 North American Bridge Championships (20)
 Vanderbilt (5) 1971, 1973, 1978, 1997, 1998
 Spingold (5) 1969, 1978, 1983, 1986, 1988
 Reisinger (3) 1970, 1976, 1980
 Open Board-a-Match Teams (1) 1993
 Men's Board-a-Match Teams (1) 1968
 North American Swiss Teams (1) 1998
 Jacoby Open Swiss Teams (1) 1991
 North American Men's Swiss Teams (1) 1989
 Life Master Pairs (1) 1968
 Life Master Men's Pairs (1) 1964
 United States Bridge Championships (6)
 Open Team Trials (6) 1969, 1971, 1973, 1979 (Jan), 1984, 1995
 Other notable wins:
 Cavendish Invitational Teams (1) 1994
 Pan American Invitational Open Teams (1) 1977
 Pan American Invitational Open Pairs (1) 1977

Runners-up
 Bermuda Bowl (2) 1973, 1974
 World Open Team Olympiad (1) 1972
 North American Bridge Championships (17)
 Vanderbilt (3) 1966, 1970, 1976
 Spingold (4) 1970, 1990, 1994, 1996
 Reisinger (5) 1968, 1986, 1990, 1993, 1994
 Grand National Teams (1) 1998
 Open Board-a-Match Teams (1) 1995
 Men's Board-a-Match Teams (2) 1969, 1984
 Blue Ribbon Pairs (1) 1968
 United States Bridge Championships (2)
 Open Team Trials (1) 1973
 Open Pair Trials (1) 1968
 Other notable 2nd places:
 Forbo-Krommenie International Teams (2) 1993, 1998
 Sunday Times Invitational Pairs (1) 1990

References

External links
  – with video interview
 
 

1938 births
1999 deaths
American contract bridge players
Bermuda Bowl players
Contract bridge writers
Drexel University alumni
People from Denton County, Texas
Place of birth missing